Bollier may refer to:

People

 André Bollier (1920–1944), French member of the French Resistance during WWII
 Barbara Bollier (born 1958), American politician
 Bobby Bollier (born 1989), American swimmer
 David Bollier, American activist, writer, and policy strategist
 Edwin Bollier, Swiss businessman

Places
 Bollier, Queensland, a locality in the Gympie Region, Queensland, Australia